Airplane gliding occurs when all the engines shut down, but the wings are still functional and can be used for a controlled descent. This is a very rare condition in multi-engine airliners, though it is the obvious result when a single-engine airplane experiences engine failure. The most common cause of engine shutdown is fuel exhaustion or fuel starvation, but there have been other cases in aviation history of multiple engine failure due to bird strikes, flying through volcano ash, ingesting debris, and various forms of damage due to water (hail, ice or overwhelming rain).

Below is a list of commercial airline flights that were forced to glide at some point while in the air.

References

External links
Ask the Captain: How far can a jet glide after losing power? by John Cox, published in USA Today, November 24, 2013

Gliding
Gliding